Harnetiaux Court is a bungalow court located at 48 N. Catalina Avenue in Pasadena, California. Joseph Harnetiaux and his family built the court in 1922. The court consists of eight single-family homes lining a narrow court and a two-story duplex at the end of the court. The homes were designed in the Colonial Revival style and feature entrance porticos supported by Tuscan columns, jerkinhead roofs, and multi-paned windows. Camphor trees line the front of the court along Catalina Avenue.

The court was added to the National Register of Historic Places on November 15, 1994.

References

Bungalow courts
Bungalow architecture in California
Houses in Pasadena, California
Houses completed in 1922
Houses on the National Register of Historic Places in California
National Register of Historic Places in Pasadena, California
Colonial Revival architecture in California
Historic districts on the National Register of Historic Places in California